The Philippine House Committee on Trade and Industry, or House Trade and Industry Committee is a standing committee of the Philippine House of Representatives.

Jurisdiction 
As prescribed by House Rules, the committee's jurisdiction includes the following:
 Consumer protection
 Designs
 Development, regulation and diversification of industry and investments
 Domestic and foreign trade
 Handicrafts and cottage industries
 Intellectual property rights
 Patents
 Prices and marketing of commodities
 Quality control
 Standards
 Trade names and trade marks
 Weights and measures

Members, 18th Congress

Historical members

18th Congress

Chairperson 
 Weslie Gatchalian (Valenzuela–1st, NPC) July 31, 2019 – December 7, 2020

Member for the Majority 
 Rodolfo Albano (LPGMA)

See also 
 House of Representatives of the Philippines
 List of Philippine House of Representatives committees

Notes

References

External links 
House of Representatives of the Philippines

Trade